John Andrew Sutherland (born 9 October 1938) is a British academic, newspaper columnist and author. He is Emeritus Lord Northcliffe Professor of Modern English Literature at University College London.

Biography
After graduating from the University of Leicester in 1964, Sutherland gained a PhD from the University of Edinburgh, where he began his academic career as an assistant lecturer. He specialises in Victorian fiction, 20th-century literature, and the history of publishing. Among his works of scholarship is the Longman Companion to Victorian Fiction (known in the US as Stanford Companion, 1989), a comprehensive encyclopaedia of Victorian fiction. A second edition was published in 2009 with 900 biographical entries, synopses of over 600 novels, and extensive background material on publishers, reviewers, and readers.

Apart from writing regularly for The Guardian newspaper, Sutherland has published eighteen books and is editing the forthcoming Oxford Companion to Popular Fiction. The series of books which starts with Is Heathcliff a murderer? has brought him a wide readership. The books in the series are collections of essays about classic fiction from the Victorian period. Carefully going over the text, Sutherland highlights apparent inconsistencies, anachronisms, and oversights, and explains references which the modern reader is likely to overlook. In some cases he demonstrates the likelihood that the author simply forgot a minor detail.  In others, apparent slips on the part of the author are presented as evidence that something is going on below the surface of the book which is not explicitly described (such as his explanation for why Sherlock Holmes should mis-address Miss Stoner as Miss Roylott in "The Adventure of the Speckled Band").

In 2001, he published Last Drink to LA, a chronicle of his alcoholism, drug addiction, and return to sobriety. In 2004, he published a biography of Stephen Spender. In 2005, he was involved in Dot Mobile's project to translate summaries and quotes of classic literature into text messaging shorthand. In the same year he was also Chair of Judges for the Man Booker Prize, despite having caused some controversy in 1999 when he revealed details of disagreements between his fellow judges in his Guardian column. In 2007, he published an autobiography The Boy Who Loved Books. The same year his annotated edition of Robert Louis Stevenson's The Black Arrow was released by Penguin Books. In 2011, he published Lives of the Novelists: A History of Fiction in 294 Lives, an 800-page book containing 294 idiosyncratic sketches of famous and lesser-known novelists selected from the past 400 years.

Partial bibliography
Is Heathcliff a Murderer? Puzzles in Nineteenth-century Fiction, Oxford University Press, 1996, 
Can Jane Eyre Be Happy? More Puzzles in Classic Fiction, OUP, 1997, 
Who Betrays Elizabeth Bennet? Further Puzzles in Classic Fiction, OUP, 1999
Henry V, War Criminal? & Other Shakespeare Puzzles, (w/ Cedric Watts), OUP, 2000,  
Last Drink to LA, Faber and Faber, 2001, 
The Longman Companion to Victorian Fiction, 2nd edition, 2009, 
The Boy Who Loved Books: A Memoir, John Murray, 2007, 
Lives of the Novelists: A History of Fiction in 294 Lives, Profile Books, 2011, 
A Little History of Literature, Yale University Press, 2013, 
How to be Well Read, Random House Books, 2014,

References

1938 births
Living people
Academics of University College London
Academics of the University of Edinburgh
Alumni of the University of Leicester
English columnists
English male journalists
English male non-fiction writers
Fellows of the Royal Society of Literature
The Guardian journalists
People educated at Colchester Royal Grammar School
Clan Sutherland
English people of Scottish descent